Henry Aldrich Swings It is a 1943 American comedy film directed by Hugh Bennett and written by Muriel Roy Bolton and Val Burton. The film stars Jimmy Lydon, Charles Smith, John Litel, Olive Blakeney, Vaughan Glaser and Marian Hall. The film was released on June 23, 1943, by Paramount Pictures.

Plot

Cast 
Jimmy Lydon as Henry Aldrich
Charles Smith as Dizzy Stevens
John Litel as Mr. Aldrich
Olive Blakeney as Mrs. Aldrich
Vaughan Glaser as Mr. Bradley
Marian Hall as Louise Elliott
Beverly Hudson as Margie
Fritz Feld as Josef Altman
Charles Arnt as Boyle

References

External links 
 

1943 films
American black-and-white films
Paramount Pictures films
American comedy films
1943 comedy films
Films scored by Paul Sawtell
The Aldrich Family films
1940s English-language films
Films directed by Hugh Bennett
1940s American films